The Union Branch is a  tributary of the Toms River in Ocean County, New Jersey in the United States.

Tributaries
 Ridgeway Branch

See also
List of rivers of New Jersey

References

Rivers of Ocean County, New Jersey
Rivers of New Jersey
Tributaries of Barnegat Bay